The 2016 Historic Grand Prix of Monaco was the tenth running of the Historic Grand Prix of Monaco, a motor racing event for heritage Grand Prix, Voiturettes, Formula One, Formula Two and Sports cars.

Report 
For this event, Race A for pre-war Grand Prix cars lost its race status and was held as a parade.

On Wednesday 11 May, before the event got underway, a new permanent Race Control building was inaugurated by Prince Albert II. It had been built to ease the considerable effort required to construct the Grand Prix circuit each year, which can take up to six weeks.

Race D featured Prince Joachim of Denmark alongside countryman and former F1 driver Jac Nellemann. Nelleman did not start the race due to brake issues in qualifying.

A notable car in Race E was the Assegai, one of the only South African-built F1 cars. It had been purchased and restored to 1962 F1 regulations specifically for this event.

Anthony Beltoise took part in Race F, driving a Matra MS120C similar to that which his father Jean-Pierre had raced at Monaco during his F1 career. The chassis used was MS120-06, which had been driven by Chris Amon in the 1971 and the 1972 Formula One seasons. He had intended to drive the BRM P160B with which his father had won the 1972 Monaco Grand Prix, but the car was impossible to acquire in France because it carries tobacco sponsorship, due to the Loi Évin. Anthony ran seventh in the race, but retired with an oil leak. Also appearing in Race F was former F1 driver Paolo Barilla, who had restored a 1970 Ferrari 312B with help from its original designer Mauro Forghieri and 2002 Dakar Rally teammate Stefano Calzi. The car ran well in practice but retired on the opening lap of the race with a broken fuel pump. The restoration project was filmed and released as a feature-length documentary, Ferrari 312B.

Stirling Moss made an appearance to celebrate the 60th anniversary of his first Monaco Grand Prix victory in 1956, and was reunited with the Maserati 250F he drove in the race.

Results

Summary

Série B: Pre-1961 F1 Grand Prix Cars and F2

Série C: Sports racing cars raced from 1952 to 1955 inclusive

Série D: Formula Junior - front engine (1958–1960)

Série E: 1500cc - F1 Grand Prix cars (1961 - 1965)

Série F: F1 Grand Prix cars (1966 - 1972)

Série G: Formula 1 cars (1973 - 1976)

References 

2016 in motorsport
Historic motorsport events
Monaco Grand Prix